Ana Cláudia da Silva Ramos (born ) is a retired Brazilian female volleyball player.

She was part of the Brazil women's national volleyball team at the 1988 Summer Olympics. She also competed at the 1986 FIVB Volleyball Women's World Championship.

References

External links
Ana Ramos at Sports Reference
http://www.fivb.com/en/about/news/cbv-honours-olympic-athletes-at-world-grand?id=62161

1961 births
Living people
Brazilian women's volleyball players
Place of birth missing (living people)
Volleyball players at the 1988 Summer Olympics
Olympic volleyball players of Brazil